Wendelin Weingartner (born February 7, 1937 in Innsbruck) is an Austrian politician who served as the Governor of Tyrol from 1993 to 2002. He studied law at the University of Innsbruck, and was the Chairman of the Landes-Hypothekenbank Steiermark in 1984.

References 

1937 births
Living people
Governors of Tyrol
Politicians from Innsbruck
University of Innsbruck alumni
Austrian People's Party politicians
20th-century Austrian politicians
21st-century Austrian politicians